Grangetown railway station is a railway station serving the Grangetown district of Cardiff, Wales. It is located on the Vale of Glamorgan Line 1 mile (1.5 km) south west of Cardiff Central towards Bridgend via Barry, Penarth and Barry Island.

Passenger services are operated by Transport for Wales as part of the Valley Lines network. The station is reached by steps, so access is not suitable for wheelchair users and would be difficult for people with prams/pushchairs.

History

This station was first opened by the Taff Vale Railway in 1882 and rebuilt with an island platform in 1904, though the railway serving it (what is now the City Line) was originally opened in 1859 to serve the nearby Penarth harbour and dock (even though the dock itself was not commissioned until 1865). The extension onwards to  &  was completed in 1878 and the Barry Railway route to  a decade later.

The original 1859 freight-only docks branch (latterly known as the Ferry Road branch) left the later route towards Cogan Junction at the station - latterly accessed by means of a ground frame and connected to the 'down' line towards Barry, it remained in regular use until the mid 1980s to serve several oil depots and a scrapyard but has since been closed & lifted.

Services
Grangetown has a very frequent service. The service pattern is as follows:

Mondays to Saturdays:

8tph to Cardiff Central and Queen Street, of which:
2tph continue to each of Merthyr Tydfil and Aberdare 
4tph continue to Bargoed, of which 1tph continues to Rhymney
4tph to Penarth
3tph to Barry Island
1tph to Bridgend

On Sundays, the service pattern decreases to:

2tph to Cardiff Central
1tp2h continues to Merthyr Tydfil
1tp2h continues to Aberdare
1tp2h continues to 
2tph to Barry Island
1tp2h to Penarth
1tp2h to Bridgend

See also
 List of railway stations in Cardiff
 Rail transport in Cardiff

References

External links

Railway stations in Cardiff
DfT Category F2 stations
Former Taff Vale Railway stations
Railway stations in Great Britain opened in 1882
Railway stations served by Transport for Wales Rail
Grangetown, Cardiff